Kharkiv is a city in Ukraine.

Kharkiv may also refer to:

 Kharkiv International Airport in Kharkiv, Ukraine
 Kharkiv North Airport, Ukraine
 Kharkiv (river), a river in Kharkiv Oblast, Ukraine
 Kharkiv Oblast, Ukraine
 Kharkiv Raion, a district of Kharkiv Oblast, Ukraine
 Kharkiv, National University of Kharkiv, Ukraine
 9167 Kharkiv, a main-belt asteroid
 FC Metalist Kharkiv, a Ukrainian football team based in Kharkiv, Ukraine
 FC Kharkiv, was a professional football club based in Kharkiv, Ukraine

See also

 
 
Kharkov (disambiguation), several uses of Kharkov which in some cases may be substituted for Kharkiv
Battle of Kharkiv (disambiguation)
Kharkiv Operation (disambiguation)
Occupation of Kharkiv (disambiguation)
Kharko, a village in Azerbaijan